Morey-Saint-Denis is a commune in the Côte-d'Or department in eastern France.

Population

Wine

Morey-Saint-Denis is situated in the Northern section of the Côte d'Or called Côte de Nuits. It is one of the principal wine producing villages of the region.

Within Morey-Saint-Denis there are five Grand Cru appellations and 20 Premier Cru vineyards. The Bonnes Mares appellation straddles the border between Morey-Saint-Denis and Chambolle-Musigny and therefore can be produced in either commune .

Grand Cru appellations
Clos de Tart
Bonnes Mares
Clos de la Roche
Clos Saint-Denis
Clos des Lambrays

Premier Cru vineyards
Les Genevrières
Monts Luisants
Les Chaffots
Clos Baulet
Les Blanchards
Les Gruenchers
La Riotte
Les Millandes
Les Faconnières
Les Charrières
Clos des Ormes
Aux Charmes
Aux Cheseaux
Les Chenevery
Le Village
Les Sorbés
Clos Sorbé
La Bussière
Les Ruchots

See also
Communes of the Côte-d'Or department
 Route des Grands Crus

References

Communes of Côte-d'Or